"Into Another" is a song by Skid Row. It was a single from their third album, Subhuman Race. The song was released in 1995 and written by bandmates Rachel Bolan and Dave "the Snake" Sabo. This is the last single Skid Row released with Sebastian Bach.

Background
"Into Another" features a music video and a remix of the song was included on the band´s compilation album, 40 Seasons: The Best of Skid Row.

The song reached #28 on the Mainstream Rock Tracks.

The track is an interesting song with tempo changes in the intro and chorus. They did a  time signature. It is very curious, because at that time pop and rock music had become very simple and minimalist, so it was surprising for Skid Row to release a single in an odd time signature and surprising that it entered the rock airplay charts.

Track listing

 "Into Another" (LP Version)
 "My Enemy" (LP Version)
 "Firesign" (Demo Version)

Charts

References

Skid Row (American band) songs
1995 singles
Songs written by Dave Sabo
Songs written by Rachel Bolan
1995 songs
Song recordings produced by Bob Rock
Atlantic Records singles